The Y2K EP was released in 1999 by Massachusetts band Converge as a limited 7" vinyl record for their 1999 European tour. It contains 3 tracks, all of which are covers.

Track listing
Side A
 "Serial Killer" (Vio-lence cover) - 2:37
 "Snowblind" (Black Sabbath cover) - 4:29

Side B
 "Disintegration" (The Cure cover) - 6:42

References

Albums with cover art by Jacob Bannon
1999 EPs